Lambulić is a Montenegrin surname, found in Montenegro and Serbia. Between 1810 and 1813, the Lambulić family migrated from Zeta (now Montenegro) to Grilë (now Albania). In 1935, four families with the surname left the Vrakë region and settled in Vranjak, Orahovac (now Kosovo). It may refer to:

Mladen Lambulić (born 1972), Montenegrin footballer
Igor Lambulić (born 1988), Montenegrin footballer
Zarija Lambulić (born 1998), Serbian footballer

See also
Lambić

References

Serbian surnames
Montenegrin surnames